Nishimori (written: 西森 lit. "west forest") is a Japanese surname. Notable people with the surname include:

, Japanese anime director
, Japanese manga artist
, Japanese footballer

Japanese-language surnames